Jess Dixon (born May 2, 1987) is a Canadian politician, who was elected to the Legislative Assembly of Ontario in the 2022 provincial election. She represents the riding of Kitchener South—Hespeler as a member of the Progressive Conservative Party of Ontario.

Before Politics
Dixon graduated from the University of Guelph with a degree in Philosophy and attended law school at the University of Ottawa. As a student, she worked in the Ministry of the Attorney General and then full-time as an Assistant Crown Attorney upon being called to the bar in 2014. after being called to the bar she moved to Cambridge to work as a provincial Crown attorney in the Kitchener courthouse.

Controversies

During the campaign, Dixon was criticized for her lack of debate attendance, lack of meetings with other candidates, lack of round table discussions, and not being accessible to the community she was running to represent. On election night she was the only candidate in the region that didn't invite the media to the election party hosted by her family.

On Nov 4th, 2022, there was a protest outside Jess Dixon's office against Bill 28. Dixon voted for and made a speech in the Legislature supporting the bill. She made no comment in response to her constituents' protest.

Electoral Record

References 

Living people
Progressive Conservative Party of Ontario MPPs
21st-century Canadian politicians
21st-century Canadian women politicians
Women MPPs in Ontario
People from Cambridge, Ontario
1987 births